Natalie Joanne Roles (born 8 September 1973 in Enfield, Middlesex) is an English actress best known for her role of DS Debbie McAllister in the ITV drama The Bill.

She started her TV career as a dancer in 1988 on the musical film It Couldn't Happen Here, starring Neil Tennant and Chris Lowe of the Pet Shop Boys. In 1993, she made a guest appearance as school secretary Janet Clark in the Press Gang episode "Head and Heart." In 1995, she appeared in an episode of sitcom Men Behaving Badly as one of Tony's three girlfriends.

Her mother is from Malta.

She appeared in an episode of Minder, Opportunity Knocks and Bruises, as Amanda, a nurse and Ray Daley's latest girlfriend. She also appeared in ITV medical drama The Golden Hour in 2005. In 1999 she played a nurse in The New Professionals.

In 2022, Roles was interviewed by former The Bill co-star Suzanne Maddock for a three-part edition of The Bill Podcast, discussing her time on the series and career as a whole. Roles has subsequently taken over from Oliver Crocker as the presenter of The Bill Podcast, interviewing her co-stars Beth Cordingly and Raji James.

In 2023, Roles was cast as Abigail Wesley in the dramatised podcast Letter from Helvetica, written by and co-starring Andrew Mackintosh, the pair having first worked together on two episodes of The Bill

Filmography
Television and Film roles;

References

External links

1968 births
People from Enfield, London
English television actresses
Living people
English people of Maltese descent